St George District Cricket Club is a cricket club based in the St. George area that competes in NSW Premier Cricket. The club's home ground is Hurstville Oval. Many famous Australian Test cricketers have represented the club.

Test players 
Sir Donald Bradman - Australian Test captain from 1936–37 to 1948, widely regarded as the greatest batsman in history. One of the ten inaugural inductees of the Australian Cricket Hall of Fame
Alan Fairfax -Played in 10 Tests from 1929 to 1931
Bill O'Reilly - Australian Test cricketer, widely regarded as one of the greatest leg spinners in history. One of the ten inaugural inductees of the Australian Cricket Hall of Fame
Ray Lindwall - Australian Test cricketer, widely regarded as one of the greatest fast bowlers in history. One of the ten inaugural inductees of the Australian Cricket Hall of Fame and member of Bradman's 1948 Invincibles
Arthur Morris - Australian Test cricketer, widely regarded as one of the greatest openers in history. Inductee of the Australian Cricket Hall of Fame and member of Bradman's 1948 Invincibles
Bill Watson- Opening batsman who played in four Tests in 1955. 
Norm O'Neill - Test batsman 1958–59 until 1964–65.
Brian Booth - Test batsman 1960–61 until 1965–66. Captained Australia in two Tests.
Kerry "Skull" O'Keeffe- Leg spinner and now a commentator for ABC Radio. O'Keeffe played 24 Tests and 2 ODIs between 1971 and 1977.
Murray Bennett -Played in three Tests and eight ODIs from 1984 to 1985. Slow left-arm orthodox spinner.
Stuart MacGill-Right-arm leg spin bowler of the Australian cricket team, with a domestic career at Western Australia, New South Wales, Nottinghamshire, Devon and Somerset. He has been credited with having the best strike rate of any modern leg-spin bowler, but he did not have a regular place in the Australian Test team due to the dominance of Shane Warne in the position of sole spinner.
Trent Copeland - Test medium pace bowler, debuted for Australia in 2011 on victorious tour of Sri Lanka
Josh Hazlewood- Made his ODI debut on the 22 June, 2010 against England where he picked up 1 wicket for 41 runs. His Test debut came against India in 2014 where he took 5 wickets in the first innings going for 68 runs.
Kurtis Patterson- Made his Test debut in 2019 against Sri Lanka scoring his maiden Test century in only his second Test for Australia.
Mark Stoneman - Made his England Test debut in 2017, playing 11 Tests with 5 half-centuries.
Rory Burns - Made his England debut in 2018, playing 32 Test matches making 3 centuries with a top score of 133 against Australia in the opening game of the 2019 Ashes series.

See also

References

External links
 St George District Cricket Club

Sydney Grade Cricket clubs
Sporting clubs in Sydney
Cricket clubs established in 1911
1911 establishments in Australia
Cricket club